Houseboat is a 1958 American romantic comedy film directed by Melville Shavelson. Both the love theme "Almost In Your Arms", sung by Sam Cooke and "Bing! Bang! Bong!", sung by Sophia Loren, were written by Jay Livingston and Ray Evans. It was presented in Technicolor and VistaVision.

Starring Cary Grant, Sophia Loren, Martha Hyer, Harry Guardino, the film was written by Shavelson and Jack Rose on the basis of an original script by Grant's wife at the time, Betsy Drake. It was released on November 19, 1958.

Plot
For over three years, Tom Winters, a lawyer working for the US State Department, has been separated from his wife and three children: David, Elizabeth and Robert. The film begins as he returns home to Washington, D.C. from Europe following his wife's death. The children want to stay in the countryside with their mother's wealthy parents and her sister Carolyn, but instead Tom takes them with him to live in Washington. They all visit the Washington Monument. Robert complains about visiting dead people. One evening, they attend the Boston Symphony. Robert disrupts the concert when he plays his harmonica. An Italian girl, Cinzia, laughs. After the concert ends, Robert separates himself from the family and disappears. Cinzia has an argument with her father.  Robert later shows up in a small rowboat with Cinzia, who seeks to experience America up close and personal. They land at a nearby carnival, where they eat pizza, dance, and "win" a harmonica. Robert catches on quickly on how to play a song on his new harmonica. Later, she brings Robert home to a worried Tom. Cinzia's father is upset with her arriving home so late. He demands that she travel with him. Cinzia decides to accept Tom's job offer. The next day, he hires her as maid to care for the children while he is away.

What follows are a series of misadventures as Tom attempts to move Cinzia and the kids away from Washington to a house in the country. Unfortunately, a train destroys the house. They wind up as inhabitants of a leaky, rotting houseboat. However. a complete renovation of the premises proves successful, and their floating new home becomes the backdrop for various episodes where Tom discovers that Cinzia is unable to cook, do laundry, or even make coffee. David tries to run away in a boat in order to be with his aunt Carolyn. Tom rescues him after David almost drowns. Tom wakes up in the morning and discovers that the house is lopsided. He decides to go fishing with David. Tom finally is able to win over his children and Cinzia. Cinzia eventually learns how to cook. Winters' sister-in-law, Carolyn, suspects Cinzia's relationship with Tom is not entirely platonic. She discovers that the houseboat is all fixed up.  So does Tom's military aide, Captain Wilson, who while somewhat drunk, rudely jokes about Cinzia's living arrangement with Winters. In the end, all misunderstandings are explained and Tom Winters finally marries his maid, as the children look on approvingly.

Cast

Production
Grant's wife Betsy Drake wrote the original script, and Grant originally intended that she would star with him. After he began an affair with Loren while filming The Pride and the Passion (1957), Grant arranged for Loren to take Drake's place with a rewritten script for which Drake did not receive credit. The affair ended in bitterness before The Pride and the Passions filming ended, causing problems on the Houseboat set. Grant hoped to resume the relationship, but Loren agreed to marry Carlo Ponti instead.

Filming locations

 Parts of the movie were filmed in Fort Washington, Maryland on the Potomac River and Piscataway Creek at the present site of Fort Washington marina.
 This film was also shot on the Tidal Basin in Washington, DC. 
 The amusement park featured in the movie was Glen Echo Park, located on the Potomac River in the Cabin John section of Montgomery County, Maryland. 
 The home in opening scene is located in Mount Vernon, Virginia 
 The hotel featured in the movie is the former Continental Hotel, located on Capitol Hill until it was demolished in the 1970s.
 Also featured is the former Watergate barge stage behind the Lincoln Memorial on the Potomac River (1935–1965). (The Watergate barge is not to be confused with the Watergate complex.)

Reception
On Rotten Tomatoes, the film holds an approval rating of 64% based on 11 reviews, with an average rating of 5.84/10.

Awards and nominations

See also
 List of American films of 1958
 Hum Hain Rahin Pyaar Ke (1993), a Bollywood film believed to have been inspired by Houseboat. It was directed by Mahesh Bhatt, who made several films believed to have been unofficially adapted from Hollywood films.

References

External links

 
 
 
 

1958 films
1958 romantic comedy films
American romantic comedy films
Films scored by George Duning
Films directed by Melville Shavelson
Films set in Washington, D.C.
Films set on boats
Houseboats
Paramount Pictures films
1950s English-language films
1950s American films